Krastev (masculine) or Krasteva (feminine) is a Bulgarian last name. It may refer to:

Anatoli Krastev (born 1947), Bulgarian cellist and pedagogue
Antonio Krastev (1961–2020), Bulgarian super heavyweight weightlifter
Ivan Krastev, Bulgarian political scientist
Krasimir Krastev (born 1984), Bulgarian football midfielder
Krastyo Krastev (1866–1919), Bulgarian writer and philosopher
Neva Krasteva (born 1946), Bulgarian organist and composer
 Nikolay Krastev (footballer, born 1979), Bulgarian football defender
 Nikolay Krastev (footballer, born 1996), Bulgarian football goalkeeper
Plamen Krastev (born 1958), Bulgarian hurdler